The 1998–99 Turkmenistan Higher League (Ýokary Liga) season was the seventh season of Turkmenistan's professional football league. Nine teams competed in 1998.

Results

External links
 

Ýokary Liga seasons
Turk
1999 in Turkmenistani football
1998 in Turkmenistani football